Jacques Zoua Daogari (born 6 September 1991) is a Cameroonian professional footballer who plays as a striker.

Club career

Cotonsport Garoua
On 22 September 2008, he signed a two-year contract with Cotonsport Garoua.

Basel
After a successful test game 31 March 2009 he transferred to and signed his contract with FC Basel in Switzerland on his 18th Birthday. Zoua joined Basel's first team for their 2009–10 season under head coach Thorsten Fink. He was first included in the first team squad in November 2009 and played his first game for the club against rivals FC Zürich in the Swiss Cup on 20 November. His first game in a starting position was on 15 March 2010 against FC Luzern. He scored his first league goal for the club on 24 March 2010 in the 4–1 home win against FC Zürich.

At the end of the 2009–10 season, Zoua won the national Double with Basel and a year later won League Championship title again. At the end of the 2011–12 season, he won his second Double, the League Championship title and the Swiss Cup with the club.

In a long season for Basel with a total of 76 games (62 in League, Cup, European Champions League, Europa League and 14 test matches) Zoua had a total of 53 appearances. At the end of the Swiss Super League season 2012–13 he won the Championship title and was Swiss Cup runner up with Basel. In the 2012–13 UEFA Europa League, Basel advanced as far as the semi-finals, there being matched against the reigning UEFA Champions League holders Chelsea, but they were knocked out, losing both home and away ties, beaten 2–5 on aggregate.

Between the years 2009 and 2013 Zoua played a total of 177 games for Basel scoring a total of 52 goals. 86 of these games were in the Swiss Super League, 14 in the Swiss Cup, 28 in the UEFA competitions (Champions League and Europa League) and 49 were friendly games. He scored 14 goals in the domestic league, seven in the cup, three in the Champions League and the other 28 were scored during the test games.

Hamburger SV
In June 2013, he signed for Hamburger SV on a three-year contract.

Erciyesspor(loan)
On 29 August 2014, Zoua was loaned to Süper Lig club Erciyesspor.

Gazélec Ajaccio
In August 2015, Zoua signed for newly promoted Ligue 1 club Gazélec Ajaccio on a three-year deal.

Kaiserslautern
On 12 August 2016, Zoua returned to Germany joining 1. FC Kaiserslautern on a three-year contract.

Beerschot
On 10 October 2017, Zoua joined Belgian Second Division club Beerschot Wilrijk.

Astra Giurgiu
On 7 September 2018, Zoua signed a three-year contract with Liga I club Astra Giurgiu.

Viitorul Constanța
On 25 October 2019, Zoua signed a one-year contract with a two-year extension option with Liga I club Viitorul Constanța. On 2 April 2020, Zoua was released from the club after having his contract mutually terminated.

Later career
After leaving Romania, Zoua returned to Cameroon. In September 2020, he was keeping fit with his former club Coton Sport. Even though it was reported that he had signed with the club in October 2020, it was later confirmed that he had signed with AS Futuro. He left the club by mutual agreement in July 2021.

In October 2021, Zoua signed with Libyan club Al-Ahly Tripoli.

International career
Zoua is also a regular in the Cameroon youth squads. He took part in the 2009 African Youth Championship, where he scored three goals, but Cameroon lost in the final against Ghana 2–0. He also played in the squad at the 2009 FIFA U-20 World Cup, but his team finished last in the group C.

Career statistics

International

Honours

Club
Basel
 Swiss Super League: 2009–10, 2010–11, 2011–12, 2012–13
 Swiss Cup: 2009–10, 2011–12
 Uhrencup: 2011

Astra Giurgiu
Cupa României runner-up: 2018–19

International
Cameroon
Africa Cup of Nations: 2017

References

External links
 
 
 
 

Living people
1991 births
Association football forwards
Cameroonian footballers
Cameroonian expatriate footballers
Cameroon international footballers
Coton Sport FC de Garoua players
FC Basel players
Hamburger SV players
Kayseri Erciyesspor footballers
Gazélec Ajaccio players
1. FC Kaiserslautern players
K Beerschot VA players
FC Astra Giurgiu players
FC Viitorul Constanța players
Al-Ahli SC (Tripoli) players
Swiss Super League players
Bundesliga players
Süper Lig players
Ligue 1 players
2. Bundesliga players
Belgian Pro League players
Challenger Pro League players
Liga I players
Expatriate footballers in Switzerland
Expatriate footballers in Germany
Expatriate footballers in Turkey
Expatriate footballers in France
Expatriate footballers in Belgium
Expatriate footballers in Romania
Expatriate footballers in Libya
Cameroonian expatriate sportspeople in Switzerland
Cameroonian expatriate sportspeople in Germany
Cameroonian expatriate sportspeople in Turkey
Cameroonian expatriate sportspeople in France
Cameroonian expatriate sportspeople in Belgium
Cameroonian expatriate sportspeople in Romania
Cameroonian expatriate sportspeople in Libya
Cameroon under-20 international footballers
2017 Africa Cup of Nations players
2017 FIFA Confederations Cup players
2019 Africa Cup of Nations players
Zoua
Cameroon A' international footballers
2020 African Nations Championship players